The 2018 Yamaguchi gubernatorial election was held on 4 February 2018 to elect the next governor of , a prefecture of Japan in the Chūgoku region of the main island of Honshu.

Candidates 
Tsugumasa Muraoka, incumbent, endorsed by LDP and Komeito.
Yuzuru Kumano, former head of the local teachers' union, JCP.

Results

References 

2018 elections in Japan
Yamaguchi gubernational elections